The 2022 Twenty20 Blaze was the sixth season of the women's Twenty20 cricket competition played in the West Indies. It took place from 7 to 14 June, with 6 teams taking part and all matches taking place at Providence Stadium in Guyana. Jamaica won the competition, their third, finishing ahead of defending champions Barbados on Net Run Rate. The tournament was followed by the 2022 Women's Super50 Cup.

Competition format
Teams played in a round-robin in a group of six, therefore playing 5 matches overall. Matches were played using a Twenty20 format. The top team in the group was crowned the Champions.

The group worked on a points system with positions being based on the total points. Points were awarded as follows:

Win: 4 points 
Loss: 0 points.
Abandoned/No Result: 2 points.

Points table

Source: Windies Cricket

Fixtures
Source: Windies Cricket

Statistics

Most runs

Source: Windies Cricket

Most wickets

Source: Windies Cricket

References

External links
 Series home at Windies Cricket

Twenty20 Blaze
2022 in West Indian cricket